Jiang Guoping (born October 1969) is a vice admiral (zhongjiang) of the People's Liberation Army (PLA) who has been deputy commander of the North Theater Command since September 2019. He is a delegate to the 13th National People's Congress.

Biography
Jiang was born into an official family in Rushan County, Shandong, in October 1962. He graduated from Dalian Naval Academy and served as its president from 2011 to 2014. In September 2014, he was commissioned as deputy chief of staff of the North Sea Fleet. In December, he became commander of the 19th Escort Formation of the People's Liberation Army Navy,  responsibling for the convoy of the Gulf of Aden. During his tenure, he was the commander of the Yemeni Overseas Chinese Evacuation Task Force. Within 12 days, he commanded the naval vesseled to safely evacuate 897 Chinese and foreign citizens. In April 2015, he rose to become chief of staff of the North Sea Fleet. In January 2017, he was appointed assistant chief of staff of the Joint Staff Department of the Central Military Commission, serving in the post until September 2019, when he was given the position of deputy commander of the North Theater Command. 

He was promoted to the rank of rear admiral (Shaojiang) in 2012 and vice admiral (zhongjiang) in December 2019.

References

1962 births
Living people
People from Rushan, Shandong
People's Liberation Army generals from Shandong
Presidents of Dalian Naval Academy